Cynthia is a feminine given name.

Cynthia may also refer to:

 Cynthia (Gaba girl), American plaster mannequin of the 1930s
 Cynthia (butterfly), a group of butterfly species in the genus Vanessa.
 "CynthIA", a nickname given by radio enthusiasts to a synthetic female voice used on numbers stations believed to be operated by the CIA.
 Cynthia (telenovela), a Mexican telenovela
 Krigia biflora, known as the two-flowered cynthia
 HMS Cynthia, the name of five ships of the Royal Navy, and a sixth which was never completed
 Cynthia Peninsula, a peninsula in northeastern Ontario, Canada
 Cynthia, Alberta, a hamlet in central Alberta, Canada
 A.S.D. Cynthia 1920, an Italian football club
 "Cynthia", a song by Bruce Springsteen from the box set Tracks
 Cynthia (film) (1947), starring Elizabeth Taylor
 Cynthia (singer), American freestyle and dance-pop singer
 Cynthia (album), 1989
 Cynthia, Mississippi

See also
 Synthia, nickname for a genetically modified bacterium (synthetic organism)
 Cyclone Xynthia, a violent European windstorm that killed more than 50 people in February 2010